The American Birkebeiner (or Birkie) is the largest cross-country skiing race in North America. It debuted in 1973 and is a founding member of the Worldloppet federation of cross-country ski marathons. The two premier events are the  skate and the  classic races from Cable to Hayward, Wisconsin. Each year more than 10,000 skiers participate in the Birkie, 29 km Kortelopet, and 15 km Prince Haakon events.

Origin
The race, which is held annually in February, was started in 1973 by Tony Wise. Wise, who started the Telemark Ski Area in Cable, Wisconsin in 1947, helped to popularize modern-day cross-country skiing when he built trails at Telemark in 1972. In February 1973, Wise drew on his Norwegian heritage in starting a race named after a famous event in Norway.

The Birkie was named after the Norwegian Birkebeinerrennet, which commemorates an important historical event. In 1206 a group of Birkebeiner party soldiers, who fought for Sverre Sigurdsson and his descendants in the Norwegian civil war, smuggled the illegitimate son of Norway's King Håkon Sverresson from Lillehammer to safety in Trondheim. In the Norwegian Birkie, classical ski participants still carry  packs symbolizing the weight of the young child-prince, Haakon.

Race
Skiers from around the world come to Hayward, Wisconsin, for the race. The Birkie has a reputation for attracting skiers of varying ability levels. Olympians, national team members, and foreign professionals have competed in the event, and the Birkie also draws recreational skiers from Wisconsin, Minnesota, and the Upper Peninsula of Michigan and countries such as neighboring Canada as well as Norway, Sweden, and other European nations. Typically almost every U.S. state is represented at the Birkie. The race weekend also includes the shorter 29 km Kortelopet "Korte", a race geared more toward recreational and elite junior skiers, and the Prince Haakon 15 km event for those who are not ready to take on the challenge of the longer courses. In 2013, registration was capped at 10,000 skiers, with an additional 20,000 spectators on the sidelines cheering on the competitors.

The Birkie course is quite hilly and is recognized as one of the more difficult cross country ski marathon courses in the world, despite the fact that there are several WorldLoppet events in Europe that are much longer. The current north–south alignment (used since 1992) has skiers traversing a  flat section before turning onto the "Powerline Hills", a series of climbs to the  mark. In the early years of the race, the Birkie began with a climb up the alpine slopes of Mount Telemark, mainly as a publicity stunt, but larger field sizes made this impractical. Beyond High Point is a series of downhills, including "Bobblehead Hill" or "Sledder Hill", which has a rather tricky downhill, left turn near a snowmobile trail — allowing dozens of snowmobilers to watch and "score" skiers' falls.

Beyond OO the course is less hilly, but by no means flat. After  is the aptly named "Bitch Hill" where spectators cheer skiers up the steepest climb of the race. Several kilometers later (just south of Highway 77) the last lengthy ascents of the race---Sunset Hill & Duffy Hill---challenge tired skiers. From the top, Hayward's water tower is a most welcome sight. There are several road crossings and open fields before the skiers cross frozen Lake Hayward. The  crossing of the lake is flat, but unprotected from wind. Once off the lake, the trail twists through the outskirts of Hayward on snow trucked in for the event. Over the course of hours, thousands of tired and proud skiers make their way past three blocks of cheering spectators lining Hayward's Main Street.  Warm conditions have occasionally required the finish line to be moved to a flat field just east of the lake.

The race begins with several waves in order to thin skiers out along the course. Alternating skate and classical waves depart every five minutes. New skiers must ski in the last wave unless they use another ski marathon time to qualify for a higher wave. One man—Ernie St. Germaine, a former employee of the Telemark Resort, where the Birkebeiner starts every year—has completed every Birkie since the first one in 1973.

In 2020 it was announced that the 2021 Birkie would be a shortened 43-kilometer race that would take place over the course of February 24–28, 2021. The course was modified as well with skiers starting and finishing at the starting line in Cable, WI. The Birkie reverted to its normal Cable to Hayward format for 2022 with the new addition of an "open track" event where participants could ski the race in a more relaxed manner on the Wednesday before the main race with less crowds and more open trail.

Winners
The American Birkebeiner Ski Foundation website lists winners of the Birkebeiner and Kortelopet from 1973.

References

External links 
 
 

Sports competitions in Wisconsin
Ski marathons in the United States
February sporting events
1973 establishments in Wisconsin
Recurring sporting events established in 1973
Bayfield County, Wisconsin
Sawyer County, Wisconsin